Shaving Peaches is the fourth album by Terrorvision. Released in 1998 as the follow-up to Regular Urban Survivors, it found the band heading in a more chart-orientated pop direction with co-production from Edwyn Collins. Here, the band push their sound further than before, veering away from metal towards a soft rock sound that uses actual electronic beats. Tracks such as "Day After Day" and "When I Die" retain the melancholy that featured on earlier albums, whilst the rest of the album follows the template of the positive and upbeat single, "Tequila".

Track listing

 "III Wishes" – 3:51
 "Josephine" – 3:11
 "Hypnotised" – 3:49
 "Can't Get You Out of My Mind" – 3:05
 "In Your Shoes" – 4:21
 "Swings and Roundabouts" – 3:25
 "Day After Day" – 3:35
 "Left to the Right" – 3:59
 "Cantankerous" – 4:15
 "Tequila" – 3:52
 "Vegas" – 3:52
 "Babyface" – 4:11
 "Spanner in the Works" – 4:15
 "When I Die" – 4:06
 "On a Mission" – 3:40
 Hidden track" – only on the first edition
 "Tequila (Mint Royale Shot)"  – 4:09 (Added to reissues of the album)

References

1998 albums
Terrorvision albums